McCormick & Schmick's Seafood Restaurants Inc. is an American seafood restaurant chain, formerly based in Portland, Oregon. As of July 2021, the  company operates 26 locations in the United States and 5 Canadian locations that operate under the Boathouse name. A sale to the parent company, Landry's, Inc., was completed in January 2012. Landry's corporate headquarters in Houston, Texas now manages all restaurant operations.

History

The company dates its roots back to the 1970s, with Bill McCormick's purchase of Jake's Famous Crawfish, a 100-plus year-old restaurant in Portland, Oregon.  McCormick hired Douglas Schmick for management, and the two formed Traditional Concepts in 1974, the precursor to the McCormick & Schmick's restaurants.

The original McCormick & Schmick's restaurant was opened in 1979 in Portland. This  location in downtown was located in the Henry Failing Building. In 2004, the company became a publicly traded company after an initial public offering. As of 2009, there were almost 100 restaurants and catering locations in the United States and Canada. In June 2009, the company closed the original location in Portland. The chain is famous for its generous happy hour, and its landmark $1.95 half-pound cheeseburger. The price was changed to $2.95 in the spring of 2009.

On April 4, 2011, Tilman J. Fertitta, who was already the company's single largest individual shareholder (less than 10%), made a bid to take McCormick & Schmick's private, offering $9.25 per share for the company's outstanding shares, a 30 percent premium over its April 1 closing price.  An offer of $8.75 per share was accepted by McCormick & Schmick's board in November 2011, with the purchase expected to be completed by January 2012.  Operations would be merged into Landry's Restaurants, though Fertitta expected to "keep some sort of an office in Portland." The sale to the conglomerate was completed in January 2012, and the once publicly traded company was removed from the NASDAQ exchange after trading under the MSSR symbol from 2004 until 2012.

See also
 List of seafood restaurants
 List of oyster bars

References

External links
 Official website

Companies based in Portland, Oregon
Seafood restaurants in the United States
Private equity portfolio companies
Restaurants established in 1979
1979 establishments in Oregon
Restaurants in Portland, Oregon
Oyster bars
American companies established in 1979
2012 mergers and acquisitions